Police General Mochammad Sanoesi (Bogor, West Java, 15 February 1935 – Jakarta, 26 December 2008) was the tenth Chief of the Indonesian National Police from 7 June 1985 to 19 February 1991.

Honour
 : Honorary Commander of the Order of Loyalty to the Crown of Malaysia - Tan Sri (P.S.M.) (1988)

References

Indonesian police officers
1935 births
2008 deaths
Chiefs of police
People from East Nusa Tenggara
Sundanese people
Honorary Commanders of the Order of Loyalty to the Crown of Malaysia